Legemeer is a village in De Fryske Marren in the province of Friesland, the Netherlands. It had a population of around 40 in 2017.

History
It was first mentioned in the 13th century as Nouimeis. Legemeer means "low lying lake". A church was mentioned in 1788, but no longer exists. The belfry was built in 1720 and replaced in 1972 after it was destroyed in a storm. In 1840, was home to 58 people.

Before 2014, Legemeer was part of the Skarsterlân municipality and before 1984 it was part of Doniawerstal.

References

External links

De Fryske Marren
Populated places in Friesland